Zomorod Soleimani (born 6 September 1980) is an Iranian footballer who plays as a goalkeeper for Kowsar Women Football League club Sepahan Isfahan and the senior Iran women's national team.

International career
Soleimani capped at senior level during the 2018 AFC Women's Asian Cup qualification.

References 

1980 births
Living people
Iranian women's footballers
Iran women's international footballers
Women's association football goalkeepers
People from Ilam Province
21st-century Iranian women